Everest Public High School  is a college preparatory, tuition-free, and public charter high school in Redwood City, California, United States. The school, which was modeled after Summit Preparatory Charter High School in Redwood City, opened in August 2009 following State approval of the Everest charter.

In 2016, Everest received U.S. News & World Report's Best High Schools Gold Award, ranking it as #21 in California and #186 nationally. The AP® participation rate at Everest Public High is 97 percent. The student body makeup is 52 percent male and 48 percent female, and the total minority enrollment is 71 percent. GreatSchools has given Everest a 9 out of 10 rating.

The location of the school has been disputed, with Sequoia District seeking to relocate it to East Palo Alto, but a lawsuit with the district was settled in May 2010. In August 2011, Everest moved to its permanent location on 5th Avenue in Redwood City.

Everest admits roughly 100 freshmen each year. As per California state charter law, when the number of applicants to a charter school exceeds the number of open spots, offers of admission are distributed through a blind lottery.

Academics
100% of Everest graduates meet or exceed the University of California A to G entrance requirements. The AP® participation rate at Everest Public High is 97 percent.

Freshmen
As freshmen, students take Biology, English, World History I, Mathematics I, Spanish, an elective course, and a Personalized Learning Time (PLT) period, also known at some schools as Study Hall. During PLT, students work on playlists and take content assessments. Playlists are essentially study lists that teachers will put together, containing useful information such as videos or sites. Content assessments are tests.

Sophomores
As sophomores, students take Physics, English, World History II, Mathematics II, Spanish, and an elective course. The workload increases by 30-50% from freshman year, as teachers continue to prepare students for college and for AP classes as juniors and seniors.

Juniors
As juniors, students take Chemistry, AP English, AP US History, Math III, Spanish, College Readiness, and another 1/2 day elective course.

Seniors
As seniors, students must take AP Environmental Science, AP Literature, and AP Government.  Students are required to take at least one math subject, either AP Statistics or AP Calculus, some students have the option to take both, but they are not required to.  All seniors must take an Expedition course or use the time for an internship.

Elective courses
For freshmen, sophomore, junior, and senior years, Everest students take an elective course. This period is called "Expeditions," it was formerly called "Intersession".  During this time students take an elective course.  Students rank their choice of courses and then they are assigned to one of their choices.  Expeditions occurs every few months, each for two week sessions, or a total of eight weeks.  The courses offered at Everest are same as they are offered in other schools in the Summit Public Schools system and do not occur at the same time.

Clubs and teams 
Everest has a number of teams and clubs, run by pupils and supervised by teachers. Some of them are the Music Club, Everest Forensics Team (speech and debate), Culinary Diversity Club, Gender and Sexuality Alliance, Comic Club, Alliance of Latin American Students (ALAS), Creativity Club, and Young Dreamers Network (which does local and international charity work). The first club was the Asian Student Union, formed back in 2010 at the Old Building. Everest students also have the opportunity to participate in a number of team sports.

New Format

Towards the end of the 2012-2013 school year the faculty of Everest PHS, and its sister schools, informed parents and students that the next school year there would be some small changes.  Throughout previous years, there were rumors that the schools would provide Chromebooks to students to use.  Previously the school had portable computers for the students to use.  In the beginning of the 2013-2014 school year, students were given Chromebooks and were told of the changes. The new changes included Self-Directed Learning, Friday PLT, the replacement of IL with PLT, replacement of tests with Content Assessments, and a new tardy policy.

The new system included several online tools such as the PLP Tool, ShowEvidence, Activate Instruction, Khan Academy, and Illuminate.  The PLP Tool showed students where they stand in the year, their scores for projects, and what Content Assessments they have passed and need to pass.  Students can use the tool to set goals and reflect on them later.  ShowEvidence is used for projects as a means of instruction and a place to turn them in.  Activate Instruction, which was introduced by Diane Tavenner on March 13, 2013 on the 20th Annual California Charter Schools Conference, is used as a means to host playlists where students can take content assessments, diagnostics, and study.  Khan Academy is a third party website that the school uses.  Khan Academy has a variety of videos lessons and exercises available to the public for free.  Illuminate, the replacement of PowerSchool, is where students would check their grades.  Since the new format changes, the school no longer has semesters and grades are given as "Projected Grades" on the PLP Tool. Illuminate is instead used to show how students did on Content Assessments and diagnostics.  Many students, parents, and faculty have commented that one or more of the online resources do not work well or at all.  Some concerns were over how the Content Assessments did not match the content covered in the Playlists.  Before the new system was introduced, parents and students were not told of the major changes. Before the beginning of the 2013-2014 school year, Activate Instruction mentioned in their  press release kit they had knowledge of the major changes before students and parents were even notified.  Activate Instruction used this information to promote themselves.

See also

San Mateo County high schools

References

External links

Educational institutions established in 2009
High schools in San Mateo County, California
Charter high schools in California
Education in Redwood City, California
2009 establishments in California